Les Pennes-Mirabeau is a commune in the Bouches-du-Rhône department in southern France, located 13.5 km (8.4 mi) from Marseille. In May every year, a medieval festival attracts tens of thousands people.

Population

Twin towns – sister cities
Les Pennes-Mirabeau is twinned with:

  Martuni (Khojavend), Nagorno-Karabakh: Les Pennes-Mirabeau and Martuni became sister cities on 11 June 2013.

See also
Communes of the Bouches-du-Rhône department

References

External links

Official website (in French)

Communes of Bouches-du-Rhône
Salyes
Bouches-du-Rhône communes articles needing translation from French Wikipedia